Pierre Joseph Garidel (1 August 1658 – 6 June 1737) was a French botanist.

Early life
Pierre-Joseph Garidel was born on 1 August 1658 in Manosque. His father was Pierre Garidel, a lawyer, and his mother, Louise de Barthelemy. He studied medicine at the University of Aix-en-Provence and the University of Montpellier.

Career
He became a professor of botany at the Aix-en-Provence. Together with Joseph Pitton de Tournefort, he studied plants from Provence. Meanwhile, he called on the French nobility to take up botany as a hobby alongside hunting.

In 1735, he published, Histoire des plantes qui naissent aux environs d'Aix et dans plusieurs autres endroits de la Provence, which describes 1,400 plants. In the preface, he writes about the history of botany in Provence and the medicinal uses of plants.

Death
He died on 6 June 1737 in Aix-en-Provence.

Legacy
The garidella, a subclass of the thalamiflorae, was named in his honour.

References

1658 births
1737 deaths
People from Aix-en-Provence
17th-century French botanists
18th-century French botanists